Adarawanthayo is a 1968 black & white Sri Lankan drama film directed by Amaranath Jayathilake.

External links
Lanka Cinema Database
 

1968 films
1960s Sinhala-language films
Sri Lankan drama films